Santa Leonor District is one of twelve districts of the province Huaura in Peru.

Geography 
Some of the highest mountains of the district are listed below:

See also 
 Q'asaqucha

References